Julie is an American sitcom starring Julie Andrews which aired on ABC from May 30 to July 4, 1992. Blake Edwards, Andrews' husband, was the director and executive producer of the series.

Synopsis
Andrews starred as Julie Carlisle, a television personality who marries a veterinarian, Sam McGuire (James Farentino). Julie, along with her new husband and stepchildren, relocates to Sioux City, Iowa. The series chronicled her new life in coping with a career and family; it was largely panned by critics and was subsequently canceled after six episodes had aired (seven had been produced) due to low ratings.

The series was broadcast in the UK on Channel 4 during Christmas 1993, but has yet to be repeated either in the UK or the US.

Cast
 Julie Andrews as Julie Carlisle McGuire 
 James Farentino as Sam McGuire
 Alicia Brandt as Joy Foy
 Laurel Cronin as Bernice "Bernie" Farrell
 Eugene Roche as Wooley Woolstein
 Kevin Scannell as Dickie Duncan
 Rider Strong as Adam McGuire
 Hayley Tyrie as Alexandra "Alex" McGuire

Episodes

References

External links

Julie! (all Episodes)

1992 American television series debuts
1992 American television series endings
1990s American sitcoms
English-language television shows
American Broadcasting Company original programming
Television shows set in Iowa
Television series by CBS Studios